Krishnapur is a railway station of the Sealdah-Lalgola line in the Eastern Railway of Indian Railways. The station is situated at Krishnapur or Kestopur near Lalgola in Murshidabad district in the Indian state of West Bengal. Total 12 trains including Lalgola Passengers and few EMU trains halt in the station.

Electrification
The Krishnanagar– section, including Krishnapur railway station was electrified in 2004. In 2010 the line became double tracked.

Incident
On 15 December 2019, a protest was going on nearby area against amended Citizenship Act. Protesters vandalized Krishnapur railway station and at this station set several trains on fire.

References

Railway stations in Murshidabad district
Sealdah railway division
Kolkata Suburban Railway stations